Urvashi Dholakia is an Indian television actress who played the iconic villain Komolika in the long running television series Kasautii Zindagii Kay and won the sixth season of Bigg Boss.

Early life
Dholakia was born on 9 July 1978 to a Punjabi mother and a Gujarati father.

Personal life
She married at age 16 and had twin boys, Kshitij and Sagar, at age 17; she has raised them as a single mother.

Career

Early career (1985–2000)
Dholakia made her acting debut at 6 in a TV commercial for Lux soap with Revathi. As a child she appeared as Rajlaxmi in the Doordarshan TV series Shrikant. Her first TV adult role was in Doordarshan's Dekh Bhai Dekh as Shilpa followed by Waqt Ki Raftar.

Widespread recognition (2000–2011)
The 2000s decade came as a golden period in bringing Dholakia to the top list of most popular actresses up until then, as she achieved a lot of universal acclaim and awards success for her great performances in the Ekta Kapoor shows Ghar Ek Mandir, Kabhii Sautan Kabhii Sahelii, Kasautii Zindagii Kay and Kahiin To Hoga.

Among these, the character of Komolika in Kasautii Zindagii Kay (2001–2008), one of the most longest running television series at that point, went on to be opined by many reviews as the most iconic villain till date, winning her a number of recognitions. Since then, Dholakia and Kapoor have collaborated many times.

Bigg Boss and more (2013–2019)
In 2012, she participated in Colors TV's Bigg Boss 6 and on 12 January 2013, she emerged as the winner of the season. As of 2017, she is featured in Colors TV's historical fantasy series Chandrakanta as Queen Iravati.

Television comeback (2022–present)
Dholakia in 2022 again came back to fiction genre in Naagin 6 as Urvashi.

Television

Movies

Awards

See also 

 List of Indian television actresses

References

External links 

 

Living people
Indian television actresses
Contestants on Indian game shows
Indian child actresses
Indian soap opera actresses
21st-century Indian actresses
Actresses in Hindi television
Punjabi people
Gujarati people
Bigg Boss (Hindi TV series) contestants
1979 births
Big Brother (franchise) winners